The Shinya Hashimoto Memorial Tournament is an annual professional wrestling memorial event produced by Steve Corino's Pro Wrestling WORLD-1 (WORLD-1) promotion, typically between July and September. It is held in honor of Japanese wrestler Shinya Hashimoto, one of the most popular stars in Japan during the 1990s, who died of a brain aneurysm in Tokyo, Japan on July 11, 2005. It is the second Hashimoto memorial show following HUSTLE's Shinya Hashimoto Memorial Six Man Tag Team Tournament in 2006. Officially sanctioned by Pro Wrestling Zero1, is the first and only Hashimoto memorial event ever held outside Japan.

Traditionally a standard 8-man single-elimination tournament, the wrestlers in the tournament are most often junior heavyweight wrestlers from independent promotions in the United States and other parts of the world. The tournament has been hosted by the New Jersey-based Pro Wrestling WORLD-1 since 2008 and has held 3 Hashimoto Memorial tournaments. In 2010, the tournament was renamed the Shinya Hashimoto Memorial Legacy Cup and held as a Puroresu-style round-robin tournament. No wrestler has ever won the tournament twice, however, both Steve Corino and Ryan Sawyer are the only wrestlers to have participated in the event more than once.

History and format
The tournament was conceived in early-2008 by Japanese promoter Yoshiyuki Nakamura and American wrestler Steve Corino as a joint project between their respective promotions, ZERO-ONE Fighting Athletes and 3K Wrestling Fighting Athletes (which would later combine with B4W Pro Wrestling to form Pro Wrestling WORLD-1) respectively, as memorial event for Japanese wrestler Shinya Hashimoto. Both Hashimoto and Nakamura, though their ZERO1 promotion, assisted many young American wrestlers, including Corino, by bringing them to compete in Japan. Proposing a U.S.-based tournament for young independent wrestlers from throughout the world to compete in his memory, the two were granted permission to hold the event by Hashimoto's widow. She later expressed interest in their son, Daichi Hashimoto, to someday participate in the tournament.

In 2010, the tournament was renamed to the Shinya Hashimoto Memorial Legacy Cup to signify the addition of the "Legacy Cup" formerly used by the defunct Premier Wrestling Federation. The tournament was also divided into a two-block system commonly used in Japanese wrestling tournaments. In this format the top two scorers in each block advance to the semi-finals, which is decided by a standard wrestling match. In the scoring for the round-robin portion, a win is worth two points, a draw is worth one, and a loss zero; all matches have a 15-minute time limit.

Tournament winners

2008
The 2008 Shinya Hashimoto Memorial Tournament was an 8-man single elimination tournament held on July 11, 2008, at Gold's Gym in Limerick, Pennsylvania. Wrestlers from several promotions, including 3K Wrestling Fighting Athletes, took part in the inaugural tournament including Jerry Lynn, Ricky Landell, Josh Daniels, Chuck "Guillotine" LeGrande, Jake Manning and King Kaluha. C. W. Anderson was also scheduled to be on the card but was replaced by Steve Corino at the last minute.

Ricky Reyes won the tournament by winning two matches at the event. Over the course of the evening, he defeated Josh Daniels in the opening round and, as the result of an unexpected time-limit draw between King Kaluha and Steve Corino, wrestled both Jerry Lynn and Ricky Landell in a Three-Way Dance to win the tournament. In addition to the tournament, several other matches were held at the event. On the undercard, Alex Balboa wrestled Are$, accompanied by Allison Danger, a match which was won by Balboa. The WORLD-1 Premier Tag Team Championship was also defended for the first time, as The Inner Circle (Tommy Thunda and Vinnie Vertigo) successfully defended the championship in a Three-Way Dance against Team MackTion (Kirby Mack and T.J. Mack) and The Best Around (Bruce Maxwell and TJ Cannon).

Results
July 11, 2008 in Limerick, Pennsylvania (Gold's Gym)

Tournament brackets
The tournament took place on July 11, 2008. The tournament brackets were:

Pin-Pinfall; Sub-Submission; CO-Countout; DCO-Double countout; DQ-Disqualification; Ref-Referee's decision

Finals

1.  Instead of Lynn receiving a bye to the finals, WORLD-1 officials ordered the tournament to be decided among the three remaining participants in a final three-way elimination match. Lynn eliminated Ricky Landell (7:44) and Ricky Reyes eliminated Lynn.

2009
The 2009 Shinya Hashimoto Memorial Tournament was an 8-man single elimination tournament held on August 28, 2009, at the Langan Baseball Arena in Morganville, New Jersey. Wrestlers from eight promotions, including Pro-Wrestling WORLD-1, were represented at the tournament including All Action Wrestling Australia, B4W Fighting Athletes, Free Female Wrestling, Platinum Pro Wrestling, Survivor, Warriors of Wrestling, and World Xtreme Wrestling C4.

"Ruthless" Ryan Sawyer won the tournament by winning three matches at the event. Over the course of the evening, he defeated Craven in the quarter-finals, Steve Corino in the semi-finals and WORLD-1 North American Champion Alex Anthony in the final match by referee decision. At age 18, Sawyer became the youngest winner in the tournament's history. Sawyer's victory over Corino, one of his two original trainers, signaled a major highlight in his career. His second trainer, Ricky Reyes, had won the inaugural tournament the previous year and, at the time, it was hinted a future match between the two in the near future.

Results
August 28, 2009 in Morganville, New Jersey (Langan Baseball Arena)

Tournament brackets
The tournament took place on August 28, 2009. The tournament brackets were:

Pin-Pinfall; Sub-Submission; CO-Countout; DCO-Double countout; DQ-Disqualification; Ref-Referee's decision

1.  Instead of Anthony receiving a bye to the finals, WORLD-1 officials ordered the semi-finals to be decided in a three-way elimination match.

2010
The 2010 Shinya Hashimoto Memorial Legacy Cup was a two-block, 8-man tournament held between September 12 and December 5, 2010, at the Knights of Columbus in Jackson, New Jersey. The name change was to reflect the revival of the Premier Wrestling Federation "Legacy Cup" previously won by Johnny Kashmere (2001) and Christopher Daniels (2002). Wrestlers from six promotions, including Pro Wrestling WORLD-1, were represented at the tournament including ACE Pro Wrestling, Combat Zone Wrestling, Pro Wrestling Zero1, Ring of Honor and Tri-State Wrestling Alliance.

Unlike the traditional 8-man single elimination tournament, the 2010 event was held as a Puroresu-style round-robin tournament with a points system similar to Champion Carnival or the World's Strongest Tag Determination League. The eight participants were split into two groups, A-Block and B-Block, with the winners of each meeting in a final match to determine the winner. Points were awarded under the following conditions:

Two points were awarded for each win by pinfall or submission.
One point were awarded for a draw, double-countout, or double-disqualification.
Zero points for a loss.

The participants were separated into two separate blocks; Adam Cole (CZW), Bobby Dempsey (ROH), Original Monster C (ZERO1) and Kid America (TWA) were in "Block A" and Ryan Sawyer (WORLD-1), Damian Dragon (WORLD-1), Sam Shields (ACE) and Super Sweet (WORLD-1) were in "Block B". The winners of each block, Adam Cole and Ryan Sawyer, faced each other in the tournament finals at the Knights of Columbus in Jackson, New Jersey on December 5, 2010. Cole, who was also then reigning WORLD-1 North American Champion, defeated Sawyer to win the tournament.

Results (Day 1)
September 12, 2010 in Jackson, New Jersey (Knights of Columbus)

Results (Day 2)
October 24, 2010 in Jackson, New Jersey (Knights of Columbus)

Results (Day 3)
December 5, 2010 in Jackson, New Jersey (Knights of Columbus)

Tournament brackets
The Shinya Hashimoto Memorial Legacy Cup was a round-robin tournament consisting of two six-man blocks, and running from September 12 to December 5, 2010.

References

External links
2009 Pro-Wrestling WORLD-1 Shinya Hashimoto Memorial Tournament at B4Wpro.com
2010 Pro-Wrestling WORLD-1 Shinya Hashimoto Memorial Tournament (Day 1) at B4Wpro.com
2010 Pro-Wrestling WORLD-1 Shinya Hashimoto Memorial Tournament (Day 2) at B4Wpro.com
2010 Pro-Wrestling WORLD-1 Shinya Hashimoto Memorial Tournament (Day 3) at B4Wpro.com

Professional wrestling memorial shows
2008 in professional wrestling
2009 in professional wrestling
2010 in professional wrestling
Professional wrestling tournaments